Nicolas De Santis (born 18 March 1966) is an internet entrepreneur. He is the CEO of De Santis, a strategy consulting firm and technology incubator. In 2004 he became the President and secretary general of Gold Mercury International Award, a think tank and global governance award organisation founded in 1961.

Early life
Nicolas De Santis is the son of Spanish actress Maria Cuadra and film producer Eduardo De Santis.

Internet Entrepreneur
De Santis is an early internet entrepreneur. He was the marketing director and co-founder of European online travel portal Opodo, a position which he left in 2003.

Nicolas was recruited by Spencer Stuart from beenz.com in 2001 to become the chief marketing officer of Opodo, the European travel portal originally co-owned with 9 European airlines including British Airways, Air France, Alitalia, Iberia, KLM, Lufthansa, Aer Lingus, Austrian Airlines and Finnair.  Opodo was the European version of Orbitz, the American travel website owned by various American airlines. In 2008, Opodo's turnover reached €1.3 billion in gross sales.

His previous internet venture was beenz.com (the first virtual internet currency) where he was chief marketing officer.  De Santis invested in and joined beenz.com in 1999 as one of the founding team members. De Santis helped to raise $100 million from several high-profile investors including Carlo de Benedetti (Espresso/La Repubblica Group) and François Pinault, holding company Artemis. Beenz was sold in 2001 to the US Carlson Marketing Group.  De Santis launched the beenz.com brand in UK, US, France, Japan, Singapore, Italy, Korea, Australia and China.

Captain Euro

In the 1990s, De Santis worked for the European Union under President Enrique Baron Crespo where he advised on issues relating to European identity and the launch of the Euro currency.

As part of the launch of the Euro currency he developed and launched the controversial Captain Euro, Europe’s superhero, designed to analyse the perceptions and emotions of Europeans regarding federalism and European identity, and appeal to the people.  It aimed to appeal to the European youth, and espouse the virtues of integration.

Captain Euro strongly divided public opinion, with some finding it to have anti-semitic undertones and ineffective. De Santis defended against claims of anti-semitism, saying that his father was tortured by the Nazis during World War II.

Brand EU Centre
In 2013, De Santis launched the Brand EU Centre, an independent, pro-EU initiative to improve the management of the European Union brand. The Centre has been launched with the support of former European Parliament President Enrique Baron Crespo and American Investor Todd Ruppert.

Background
De Santis started his career at Landor Associates (now WPP Group) where his father was a partner. As a strategy advisor, Nicolas has created strategies and visions for governments, academic institutions, global brands, and technology start-ups, such as: British Airways, Opodo, Morgan Stanley, Iberdrola, Garanti Bank, Coca-Cola, PRISA and the European Union (see Captain Euro), among others.

Board memberships
De Santis was a board member of Nasdaq-listed Lyris Technologies – a digital marketing & CRM analytic solutions company. Based in Silicon Valley, California, Lyris was acquired by Texas-based AUREA Software in 2015.

In January 2013, he joined the board of the Global Virus Network (GVN) where he is a senior advisor. De Santis believes that: "As our planet's population grows exponentially, GVN's role in tackling old and new viruses will become central in preventing, protecting and curing present and future generations."

In 2019, he joined the board of trustees of the World Law Foundation, an international organisation promoting peace and respect for the rule of law,  associated with the World Jurist Association. In 2021, he joined the board of directors of Nasdaq-listed Ferroglobe, a producer of silicon metal, silicon-based alloys and manganese-based specialty alloys.

Personal life
He is married to the American swimsuit designer Melissa Odabash, and they have two teenage daughters.

References

External links
 Official website

1966 births
Living people
People from Madrid
Spanish businesspeople